Whitchurch Canonicorum Hundred or Whitechurch Canonicorum Hundred was a hundred in the county of Dorset, England, containing the following parishes:

Burstock
Catherston Leweston
Charmouth
Chideock
Lyme Regis
Marshwood
Pilsdon
Stanton St Gabriel
Stockland (part) (i.e., Dalwood, transferred to Devon 1844)
Symondsbury
Whitchurch Canonicorum
Wootton Fitzpaine

See also
List of hundreds in Dorset

Sources
Boswell, Edward, 1833: The Civil Division of the County of Dorset (published on CD by Archive CD Books Ltd, 1992)
Hutchins, John, History of Dorset, vols 1-4 (3rd ed 1861–70; reprinted by EP Publishing, Wakefield, 1973)
Mills, A. D., 1977, 1980, 1989: Place Names of Dorset, parts 1–3. English Place Name Society: Survey of English Place Names vols LII, LIII and 59/60

Hundreds of Dorset